High Rock is a former district of the Bahamas. It corresponds roughly to the current district of East Grand Bahama. The Bahamian Brewery makes a High Rock beer.

Former districts of the Bahamas